Libervia (formerly Salut à Toi or SàT) is a multifunctional communications application and decentralized social network published under the AGPL-3.0-or-later license.

Initially made for instant messaging and chat, Libervia developed additional functionality which can be used for microblogging, blogging, filesharing, audio and video streaming, and gaming. It has Atom feeds, and both WYSIWYM and WYSIWYG editors.

It uses the XMPP. It also implemented ActivityPub in beta in late 2022, with a gateway that allows the two protocols to intercommunicate, aiming to have it in alpha in early 2023.

Architecture 
Salut à Toi uses a client-server architecture. The client consists of a backend daemon (which can be installed locally or on a  server) and one of several frontends. Frontends include:

 jp, a command-line interface
 Cagou, a frontend for desktops and mobile phones
 Libervia-web (formerly Libervia), a web interface
 Primitivus, a text-based user interface

Third-party frontends include:
 Wix, WxWidgets-based desktop GUI (now deprecated)
 Bellaciao, Qt-based graphical user interface (development on hold)
 Sententia, an Emacs frontend (development is currently stalled)

References

External links 
 

XMPP clients
Free XMPP clients
Microblogging software
Free instant messaging clients
Free software programmed in Python
2009 software
Linux software
Android (operating system) software
Cross-platform free software
Fediverse
Streaming software
Gaming
Atom (Web standard)
Open formats
Web syndication
Internet Relay Chat